"UFO" is a song by Swedish DJ/music producing house music duo Vigiland, made up of Claes Remmered Persson and Otto Pettersson.

Charts

Weekly charts

Year-end charts

Certifications

References

2014 songs
House music songs